Perry is a city in Jefferson County, Kansas, United States.  As of the 2020 census, the population of the city was 852.

History
Perry had its start in the year 1865 by the building of the railroad through that territory.  It was named for John D. Perry, the President of the Kansas Pacific Railroad.

The first post office in Perry  was established in October 1866.

Geography
Perry is located at  (39.075458, -95.391902).

Climate
The climate in this area is characterized by hot, humid summers and generally mild to cool winters.  According to the Köppen Climate Classification system, Perry has a humid subtropical climate, abbreviated "Cfa" on climate maps.

Demographics

Perry is part of the Topeka, Kansas Metropolitan Statistical Area.

2010 census
As of the census of 2010, there were 929 people, 375 households, and 254 families living in the city. The racial makeup of the city was 95.7% White, 1.1% African American, 0.4% Native American, 0.3% Asian, 0.4% from other races, and 2.0% from two or more races. Hispanic or Latino of any race were 2.2% of the population.

There were 375 households, of which 36.0% had children under the age of 18 living with them, 50.4% were married couples living together, 11.5% had a female householder with no husband present, 5.9% had a male householder with no wife present, and 32.3% were non-families. 26.7% of all households were made up of individuals, and 13.6% had someone living alone who was 65 years of age or older. The average household size was 2.48 and the average family size was 2.92.

The median age in the city was 37.1 years. 27.1% of residents were under the age of 18; 6.4% were between the ages of 18 and 24; 25.6% were from 25 to 44; 25.3% were from 45 to 64; and 15.6% were 65 years of age or older. The gender makeup of the city was 47.6% male and 52.4% female.

2000 census
As of the census of 2000, there were 901 people, 370 households, and 260 families living in the city. The racial makeup of the city was 94.12% White, 0.67% African American, 0.67% Native American, 0.33% Asian, 0.22% Pacific Islander, 0.33% from other races, and 3.66% from two or more races. Hispanic or Latino of any race were 1.00% of the population.

There were 370 households, out of which 33.5% had children under the age of 18 living with them, 55.4% were married couples living together, 11.9% had a female householder with no husband present, and 29.7% were non-families. 24.9% of all households were made up of individuals, and 14.1% had someone living alone who was 65 years of age or older. The average household size was 2.44 and the average family size was 2.91.

In the city, the population was spread out, with 25.7% under the age of 18, 9.3% from 18 to 24, 27.3% from 25 to 44, 21.8% from 45 to 64, and 15.9% who were 65 years of age or older. The median age was 37 years. For every 100 females, there were 94.6 males. For every 100 females age 18 and over, there were 89.0 males.

The median income for a household in the city was $39,013, and the median income for a family was $46,641. Males had a median income of $32,778 versus $26,500 for females. The per capita income for the city was $17,577. About 4.9% of families and 7.9% of the population were below the poverty line, including 6.0% of those under age 18 and 12.0% of those age 65 or over.

Education
The community is served by Perry-Lecompton USD 343 public school district. School unification consolidated Perry and Lecompton schools forming USD 343 in 1970. Perry-Lecompton High School is located in Perry. Lecompton Elementary School is located in Lecompton. The Perry-Lecompton High School mascot is Kaws.

Prior to school unification, the Perry High School mascot was Kaws.

Parks and Recreation
 Perry Lake and Perry State Park
 Great Flood of 1951

References

External links

 City of Perry
 Perry - Directory of Public Officials
 USD 343, local school district
 Perry City Map, KDOT

Cities in Kansas
Cities in Jefferson County, Kansas
Topeka metropolitan area, Kansas